"Rescue Me"/"Smile Again" is a song by the J-pop group Every Little Thing, released as their sixteenth single on June 14, 2000.

Track listing
 Rescue Me (single mix) (Words & music - Mitsuru Igarashi)
 The One Thing (single mix) (Words - Every Little Thing / music - Mitsuru Igarashi)
 Smile Again (Words - Every Little Thing / music - Mitsuru Igarashi)
 Rescue Me (remix)
 Smile Again (Dub's Knock On remix)
 Rescue Me (instrumental)
 The One Thing (instrumental)
 Smile Again (instrumental)

Chart positions

External links
 "Rescue Me/Smile Again" information at Avex Network.
 "Rescue Me/Smile Again" information at Oricon.

2000 singles
Every Little Thing (band) songs
Songs written by Mitsuru Igarashi
Avex Trax singles